Margaretha van Norden (9 October 1911 – 6 August 1963) was a Dutch swimmer. She competed in the women's 200 metre breaststroke event at the 1928 Summer Olympics.

References

External links
 

1911 births
1963 deaths
Olympic swimmers of the Netherlands
Swimmers at the 1928 Summer Olympics
Sportspeople from Zaanstad
Dutch female breaststroke swimmers